Not My Sister is a lost 1916 silent film drama directed by Charles Giblyn and starring Bessie Barriscale and William Desmond. It was produced by Thomas H. Ince for Kay-Bee Pictures and distributed by Triangle Film Corporation in Culver City, California.

The Library of Congress includes the film among the National Film Preservation Board's list of "7,200 Lost U.S. Silent Feature Films" produced between 1912 and 1929.

Cast
Bessie Barriscale - Grace Tyler
William Desmond - Michael Arnold
Franklin Ritchie - John Marshall
Alice Terry - Ruth Tyler (credited as Alice Taafe)
Louise Brownell - Mrs. Tyler
Mabel Johnson - undetermined

References

External links
 Not My Sister at IMDb.com

1916 films
American silent feature films
Lost American films
American black-and-white films
Films directed by Charles Giblyn
Silent American drama films
1916 drama films
1916 lost films
Lost drama films
1910s American films